Boyne is a variation of Bóinn or Boann, Irish goddess of the River Boyne.

Boyne may also refer to:

Places
 Boyne Castle, a ruined castle in Aberdeenshire, Scotland
 Boyne City, Michigan, a town in Charlevoix County in the U.S. state of Michigan
 Boyne Falls, Michigan, a village in Charlevoix County in the U.S. state of Michigan
 Boyne Island, Queensland, mainland town in Queensland, Australia, on the west bank of the Boyne River 
 Boyne River (disambiguation)
 Boyne Valley, Queensland, rural locality in the Gladstone Region of Queensland, Australia, comprising the towns of Builyan, Many Peaks, Nagoorin, and Ubobo
 Boyne Public School, a JK–8 public school in Milton, Ontario, Canada
 Boyne, a name for the headquarters of Zion Christian Church, South Africa

People
 Gil Boyne (1924–2010), American hypnotherapist
 John Boyne (b. 1971), Irish novelist
 Peter Boyne (b. 1944), Australian Rules footballer who played for the Collingwood Football Club
 Walter J. Boyne (1929–2020), U.S. Air Force officer and historian

See also
 Battle of the Boyne, 1690 battle on Irish land, in which the forces of Prince William of Orange defeated those of the deposed King James II of England
 Boyne Mountain Resort, a ski resort in Northern Michigan, United States
 Boyne Resorts, a company that owns and operates ski and golf resorts in the United States
 Brú na Bóinne, valley in County Meath, Ireland, at a bend in the River Boyne